Megami Tensei is a series of role-playing video games primarily developed and published by Atlus. It began in 1987 with the Famicom game Digital Devil Story: Megami Tensei, and has since spawned several spin-offs and sub-series, such as Shin Megami Tensei, Persona and Devil Summoner. In addition to the console and computer releases, there are Megami Tensei mobile games, several of which are developed by Menue. The series also includes additional media, such as anime series and films, manga, and a live-action television series, and has seen several music album releases.

The series has several recurring themes, including demon-summoning, Japanese folklore, and the occult. Despite its thematic roots in Japanese culture and mythology, it has found a cult following internationally.

Video games

The Megami Tensei video game series began with the 1987 game Digital Devil Story: Megami Tensei, which was published by Namco for the home video game console Famicom, and was based on Aya Nishitani's novel of the same name. It received a sequel in 1990, after which a number of sub-series were created; the Shin Megami Tensei sub-series, along with the original Digital Devil Story: Megami Tensei titles, form the core of the Megami Tensei series, while others, such as the Devil Summoner and Persona series, as well as the Fire Emblem crossover Tokyo Mirage Sessions #FE, are spin-offs. Some spin-offs belong to other genres than role-playing, such as the fighting game Persona 4 Arena, the action game Jack Bros., and the strategy game Majin Tensei. Most entries in the series are unrelated to one another, but carry over common thematic elements and gameplay mechanics, such as a contemporary urban setting, occult themes, demon-summoning and recruitment, and the ability to fuse two or more demons together to create more powerful demons.

Most of the games are developed by Atlus, but other companies have also been involved, including Multimedia Intelligence Transfer, Lancarse, CAVE, Nex Entertainment, and Arc System Works. Atlus has also worked with Menue on multiple mobile spin-off games, including ones based on Persona and Devil Summoner.

Film and television

Manga

Music albums

Notes

References

Japanese television-related lists
 
Megami Tensei